The 1988 United States presidential election in Maine took place on November 8, 1988, as part of the 1988 United States presidential election, which was held throughout all 50 states and D.C. Voters chose four representatives, or electors to the Electoral College, who voted for president and vice president.

Maine voted for the Republican nominee, Vice President George H. W. Bush, over the Democratic nominee, Massachusetts Governor Michael Dukakis, by a margin of 11.45%. Bush took 55.34% of the vote to Dukakis’ 43.88%, and swept every county in the state.

Bush's comfortable win was expected, due to the state's Republican lean at the time, and the Bush family ties to the state (Bush owned a house in Kennebunkport, Maine).

, this is the last time that a Republican presidential nominee would carry the state of Maine as a whole, as well as the counties of Cumberland, Hancock, Knox, Sagadahoc and York. Like the rest of liberal and secular New England, Maine would subsequently begin to drift towards the Democratic Party as the GOP became increasingly dominated by conservatives, Southerners, and Evangelical Christians, and is now considered a safe blue state. However, Maine's 2nd congressional district would give its electoral vote to Republican Donald Trump in 2016 and 2020.

Despite winning every county in the state this election, Bush would not win a single one during his re-election bid in 1992.

Results

Results by county

See also
 United States presidential elections in Maine
 Presidency of George H. W. Bush

References

Maine
1988
1988 Maine elections